The fourth season of the American drama television series 24, also known as Day 4, premiered on January 9, 2005, on Fox and aired its season finale on May 23, 2005. The season four storyline starts and ends at 7:00 am.

Season overview
The fourth season is set 18 months after season three. Jack is now working for Secretary of Defense James Heller after being fired by CTU due to his heroin addiction. As the day begins, he gets caught up in an elaborate terrorist plot which involves James Heller and his daughter Audrey Raines.

Unlike other seasons which focus on a singular threat, multiple enemies, and conspiracies, this season is based around one main enemy: a terrorist named Habib Marwan who controls a series of Middle Eastern terrorist cells that launch attacks against the United States. Rather than large acts, this season is divided into several smaller acts depending on which terrorist threat Marwan is focusing.

A train bombing is a diversion to kidnap the secretary of defense and his daughter.
A device from the train is used to initiate the forced meltdowns of nuclear power plants across America.
Terrorists steal a stealth fighter to shoot down Air Force One.
The terrorists steal the nuclear football, allowing them to launch a nuclear missile towards Los Angeles that must be intercepted.

Major subplots
 When Jack Bauer returns to field work, he clashes with other members of CTU over how operations should be run.
 Jack's relationship with Audrey is strained because she is horrified at the pain he is willing to inflict to acquire information.
 Audrey's brother Richard withholds information that could help CTU by claiming they have no right to invade his privacy.
 The Araz family is torn apart by conflicting opinions about the morality of inciting a nuclear catastrophe.
 Curtis suspects a co-worker, with whom he was previously involved, of being a mole.
 The crisis prevents Erin Driscoll, the new director of CTU, from being able to look after her daughter who has schizophrenia.
 Tony Almeida and Michelle Dessler although divorced, find themselves working in the same office again.
 Charles Logan feels overwhelmed when he unexpectedly takes over the presidency during a crisis.
 David Palmer begins to discover corruption within the government.
 After the Chinese consul dies of friendly fire, CTU attempts to cover up the fact that Jack Bauer invaded the Chinese consulate.

Summary
Day 4 begins with the bombing of a commuter train which (unbeknownst to CTU at the time) enables the theft of a device known as the Dobsen-type Override which could be used to take control of (and melt down) United States nuclear power plants. With Jack Bauer working for Secretary of Defense James Heller, his job brings him to CTU as a visitor on this very day.

Believing that something terrible is about to happen, Jack begs CTU director Erin Driscoll to reinstate him and begins to interrogate a suspect. The suspect reveals that James Heller and Audrey Raines are the primary targets just as they are kidnapped. When Jack saves a civilian programmer who discovered evidence of a cyber-attack in progress (a friend of Chloe O'Brian), he allows one of the terrorists to escape and lead him to where Raines and Heller are being held. Even though Jack rescues them, the mass streaming of the planned execution video gives the terrorists the opportunity they need to launch an attack on the firewalls and begin using the override.

CTU finds out about the override with the help of Bauer and Tony Almeida and identifies the man responsible for using it: Habib Marwan, an employee of the defense contractor that developed the override. Marwan is able to sabotage one plant, the San Gabriel Island reactor, before Jack's team puts him on the run. Seeking extra intelligence, Bauer and Paul Raines (Audrey's ex-husband) travel to the headquarters of the defense contractor McLennan-Forrester. However, in an effort to cover up their complicity and erase computer records, McLennan-Forrester activates an EMP, causing a blackout over an  section of downtown Los Angeles.

McLennan-Forrester sends mercenaries after Bauer and Raines. They critically injure Raines just as agents arrive sent by Tony Almeida and Michelle Dessler. The resulting turmoil allows a stealth fighter to be stolen from an Air Force base in Southern California. The pilot of the fighter shoots down Air Force One, which crashes into the Mojave Desert, almost killing President Keeler in the process. Vice-President Charles Logan takes over for Keeler and seeks the help of David Palmer, when the role proves too much for him. Ultimately, Marwan's terror cells steal the nuclear football from the Air Force One crash site and they attempt to use it to commandeer a nuclear missile in Iowa.

Chloe nearly loses her life finding a lead about the missile. It leads Jack to a complicit Chinese national, Lee Jong, hiding at his nation's consulate in Los Angeles. When negotiations break down, Jack leads a clandestine raid against the Chinese consulate and kidnaps Jong. Poorly placed shots by Chinese guards kill the Chinese consul and injure Jong. Paul Raines dies in surgery when Jack insists that saving Lee Jong is a priority. This destroys his relationship with Audrey Raines. The nuclear missile is subsequently launched and CTU begins a last-ditch effort to discover its trajectory and intercept it. As Jack closes in on Marwan and the missile's location, Chinese agents find proof that Jack Bauer invaded their territory. To prevent American secrets from falling into Chinese hands, government officials propose that Jack be conveniently killed.

In a reversal of the events of Day 1, David Palmer warns Bauer of the attempt on his life, shortly after the nuclear missile is shot out of the sky. In response, Bauer fakes his own death with the help of Tony Almeida, Michelle Dessler and Chloe O'Brian. When Bauer is safely outside CTU, he says a final goodbye to his friend and president David Palmer. He then leaves his old life behind and disappears into the sunrise.

Characters

When the season began, every character from the first three seasons was absent except for Jack Bauer, President Keeler (Palmer's Republican opponent in season 3), and Chloe O'Brian. However, as the season went on several characters returned, including Tony Almeida, Michelle Dessler, Mike Novick, David Palmer, Aaron Pierce, and Mandy, the assassin from seasons 1 and 2. To make room for these characters, other characters left. Alberta Watson left after 12 episodes, Lana Parrilla—upgraded from recurring to the main cast in episode 7—was gone by episode 13 and William Devane left after episode 14 making one brief appearance afterwards. Also, Roger Cross was upgraded from recurring to main cast in episode 14, making him the only other actor along with Parrilla to be upgraded to main cast mid-season in the history of the series. As a result, season 4 featured more cast changes than any previous season.

Starring
 Kiefer Sutherland as Jack Bauer (24 episodes)
 Kim Raver as Audrey Raines (24 episodes)
 Alberta Watson as Erin Driscoll (12 episodes)
 Lana Parrilla as Sarah Gavin (12 episodes)
 Roger Cross as Curtis Manning (22 episodes)
 William Devane as Secretary of Defense James Heller (15 episodes)

Special guest stars
 Carlos Bernard as Tony Almeida (18 episodes)
 Reiko Aylesworth as Michelle Dessler (13 episodes)

Special guest appearance by
 Dennis Haysbert as David Palmer (6 episodes)

Guest starring

Episodes

Production
Season 4 was the first of three 24 seasons to be promoted with a prequel. The 10-minute prequel to the season was available with the third season DVD. It shows Jack being fired from his previous position at CTU and the beginnings of his relationship with Audrey Raines. It was broadcast on Sky One in the UK before the showing of the fourth season in that country. It was also available in the UK release of the fourth season DVD.

Additionally, "24: Conspiracy," 12 one-minute-long Mobisodes (mobile phone episodes), were created in 2005 as a promotion for Season Four. The episodes were originally seen by cell phone users in Europe and later in the United States as part of a Fox promotion for the show. The storyline continues to follow the Los Angeles branch of CTU.

Trailer
FOX's trailer for the fourth season of 24 begins with Jack telling Audrey that he is glad he no longer works for CTU. This discussion is interspersed with flashbacks to action sequences from previous seasons, implying that such experiences are a part of Jack that will never go away. The end of the trailer touches on differences between season 4 and previous seasons – e.g. "the enemy is more unpredictable". This echoes comments that Kiefer Sutherland made before the season 3 finale. He said "For three years, we've done the same scenario: A specific issue generates a 24-hour response. Next season will be dramatically different."

Continuous airing
The Fox Network decided to implement a year-round schedule because episodes of the show would be broadcast irregularly due to the fact that Fox had recently obtained the rights to air the World Series for several years. Thus, FOX chose to air all 24 episodes, without any hiatuses, over 19 weeks beginning mid-season—with back-to-back episodes airing twice in the first week, and again at the season finale. Utilizing the extra time this opportunity afforded the writers, season four's later premiere date allowed the creators to go back to previous episodes and fill in continuity errors and plot holes, making the episode transitions more fluid and realistic.

Reception
The fourth season of 24 received positive reviews with a Metacritic score of 79 out of 100. On Rotten Tomatoes, the season has an approval rating of 95% with an average score of 8.3 out of 10 based on 20 reviews. The website's critical consensus reads, "The countdown remains breathlessly exhilarating even on the fourth try, with Kiefer Sutherland remaining a riveting star amidst an adrenaline-spiking crisis that finds new ways to up the stakes."

Kiefer Sutherland won the Screen Actors Guild Award for Outstanding Performance by a Male Actor in a Drama Series, two years after his previous win. 24 also won a Satellite Award in 2005 for Outstanding DVD Release of a Television Show. A trailer released for the fourth-season premiere summarized some of the critical praise for the season. The Houston Chronicle said "it grabs you and never lets go", The New York Times gave it four stars and Vogue said "the series that reinvented suspense has become an addiction".

Award nominations

Depiction of torture
In the wake of the real-life Abu Ghraib scandal and similar allegations at other U.S. military facilities housing suspected terrorists, commentators accused the show of legitimizing the use of torture in the war on terror. Unlike other 24 seasons which featured them incidentally, torture scenes were crucial to the theme of Season 4 which examined the consequences of Jack Bauer's belief that the end justifies the means. Despite preventing a nuclear attack, there are several consequence to his actions: Dina Araz is killed in a risky sting operation, Paul Raines dies when Jack forces the only available surgeon to save a suspect, Jack loses the love of Audrey Raines and ultimately has to fake his own death and start a new life. In an interview with Charlie Rose, Kiefer Sutherland commented on the show's use of torture and how it relates to the recent controversies over government-sanctioned torture. "Do I personally believe that the police or any of these other legal agencies that are working for this government should be entitled to interrogate people and do the things that I do on the show? No, I do not."

Home media releases

References

External links
 

24 (TV series)
2005 American television seasons